Masis Voskanyan (born 11 July 1990) is an Armenian international footballer who plays for Sint-Eloois-Winkel in the Belgian First Amateur Division, as a midfielder.

Club career
Born in Abovyan, Armenian SSR, Voskanyan moved to Belgium with his family at the age of three. During his first years of playing football, he represented Belgian clubs KS Veurne, Club Brugge and Roeselare. In 2014, he returned to Armenia to play for Pyunik where he won the domestic double, but he returned to Belgium after one season where he began playing for Coxyde. He only played one season there before moving to Sint-Eloois-Winkel in 2016.

International career
Between 2009 and 2010, Voskanyan played for the Armenian under-17 national team. In 2010, Voskanyan played for the Armenian under-19 national team, appearing in qualifying matches for the 2010 UEFA European Under-19 Football Championship. His debut was on 4 September 2009, in a home game against Switzerland, which ended with a 1–3 defeat.

Voskanyan made his debut for the Armenian senior team in 2012.

Honours
Pyunik
 Armenian Premier League: 2014–15
 Armenian Cup: 2014–15

References

1990 births
Living people
People from Abovyan
Armenian footballers
Association football midfielders
Armenia international footballers
Club Brugge KV players
K.S.V. Roeselare players
FC Pyunik players
K.V.V. Coxyde players
Sint-Eloois-Winkel Sport players
Belgian Pro League players
Challenger Pro League players
Belgian Third Division players
Armenian Premier League players
Armenian expatriate footballers
Armenian expatriate sportspeople in Belgium
Expatriate footballers in Belgium
Armenia youth international footballers
Armenia under-21 international footballers